is a Japanese diver. He competed in the men's 3 metre springboard at the 2016 Summer Olympics, where he was eliminated in the preliminary rounds, finishing 22nd out of 29 competitors.

He has qualified to represent Japan at the 2020 Summer Olympics.

References

External links
 
 
 

1992 births
Living people
Divers at the 2016 Summer Olympics
Japanese male divers
Olympic divers of Japan
Universiade medalists in diving
Divers at the 2014 Asian Games
Divers at the 2018 Asian Games
Asian Games medalists in diving
Asian Games bronze medalists for Japan
Medalists at the 2014 Asian Games
Medalists at the 2018 Asian Games
Universiade bronze medalists for Japan
Medalists at the 2011 Summer Universiade
Divers at the 2020 Summer Olympics
21st-century Japanese people